The 2019 Manly-Warringah Sea Eagles season was the 70th in the club's history since their entry into the then New South Wales Rugby Football League premiership in 1947. The team came sixth in the regular season and qualified for the finals where they beat the Cronulla-Sutherland Sharks in an elimination final then lost to the South Sydney Rabbitohs in the semi finals round.

Signings/Transfers

Gains

Losses

Ladder

Ladder Progression 

 Numbers highlighted in green indicate that the team finished the round inside the top 8.
 Numbers highlighted in blue indicates the team finished first on the ladder in that round.
 Numbers highlighted in red indicates the team finished last place on the ladder in that round.
 Underlined numbers indicate that the team had a bye during that round.

Fixtures

Regular season

Finals

References

Manly Warringah Sea Eagles seasons
Manly Warringah Sea Eagles
2019 in rugby league
2019 in rugby league by club